Nina Khadzhiyankova (born 18 September 1963) is a Bulgarian basketball player. She competed in the women's tournament at the 1988 Summer Olympics.

References

1963 births
Living people
Bulgarian women's basketball players
Olympic basketball players of Bulgaria
Basketball players at the 1988 Summer Olympics
Sportspeople from Plovdiv